Aldai Constituency is an electoral constituency in Kenya. It is one of six constituencies of Nandi County. The constituency was established for the 1966 elections.  The constituency has six wards, all electing Members of County Assembly for  Nandi County. Aldai is one of the constituencies being led by Hon Cornelly serem 2013-17 Jubilee elect.

Members of Parliament

Election Results

2017 General Election

Wards

References 

Constituencies in Nandi County
Constituencies in Rift Valley Province
1966 establishments in Kenya
Constituencies established in 1966